Kelly O'Donnell (born May 17, 1965) is an American journalist. She is a political reporter for NBC News as White House and Capitol Hill correspondent. She appears on NBC Nightly News, Today, Meet The Press, and MSNBC.

Background
O'Donnell graduated from Northwestern University in 1987 with a Bachelor of Science in Education degree, focusing on a combined course of study in journalism and public policy.

She served as a reporter and anchor at WJW TV in Cleveland, Ohio, in the 1990s. At this time, O'Donnell worked with former NBC reporter Martin Savidge when WJW was still a CBS station in Cleveland.

Beginning in 1994, O’Donnell followed a broad range of stories as an NBC News correspondent based in New York City and Los Angeles.

O'Donnell was a regular panelist on The Chris Matthews Show until it was canceled. She had served as news anchor and substitute host on the Weekend Today program and the weekend edition of Nightly News. She has contributed reports to the primetime news magazine Dateline NBC. She served as White House correspondent for NBC News during the second term of George W. Bush; following the 2008 presidential campaign season, she became Capitol Hill correspondent.

O'Donnell has covered the Bush Administration, Congress, and several presidential campaigns. In 2016, she was the first to report live on television that Hillary Clinton had called Donald Trump over the phone to concede the presidential election. During the Iraq war, she was embedded with the 3rd Infantry Division, stationed in Baghdad and Qatar. In addition, O'Donnell has reported a wide variety of events, including the September 11 attacks, the Space Shuttle Columbia disaster, the Oklahoma City bombing, and the O. J. Simpson trial. O'Donnell reported on the travels and death of Pope John Paul II. She also covered both summer and winter Olympic games.

Honors
O'Donnell was inducted into the Cleveland Journalism Hall of Fame in 2011 and the Ohio Radio/Television Broadcasters Hall of Fame in 2004.

She has received the 2014 Alumnae Award and in 2010 the Alumni Merit award from Northwestern University. In 2017, O'Donnell was awarded the Northwestern Alumni Medal—the highest honor given by the Northwestern Alumni Association.

She has received many honors, including Emmy awards, a National Headliner award, a New Hampshire Primary Award for Political Reporting, and Los Angeles Press Club awards.

In 2021, she was elected president of the White House Correspondents' Association for 2023–2024.

Personal life
Kelly grew up in Mentor, Ohio. She graduated Villa Angela Academy (now Villa Angela-St. Joseph High School), a Catholic school in Cleveland.

O'Donnell’s grandparents on both sides came from Ireland and she maintains Irish citizenship. She is married to J. David Ake.

References

External links

Senate Press

1965 births
Living people
American television reporters and correspondents
American women television journalists
MSNBC people
NBC News people
Northwestern University School of Education and Social Policy alumni
Television anchors from Cleveland
American people of Irish descent